Gemmuloborsonia clandestina is a species of sea snail, a marine gastropod mollusc in the family Turridae.

Description
The length of the shell attains 25 mm.

Distribution
This species occurs in the Pacific Ocean off the Philippines.

References

External links
 

clandestina
Gastropods described in 2009